Cincinnati Northern Railroad or Cincinnati Northern Railway may refer to:
Cincinnati Northern Railroad (1894–1938) in Ohio and Michigan, later part of the New York Central Railroad
Cincinnati Northern Railway (1880–1883) in Ohio, later part of the Pennsylvania Railroad